The 2014 Hero Indian Super League was the first season of the Indian Super League, the top flight football league of India. The season featured eight teams, each playing 14 matches during the regular season.

The regular season started on 12 October when Atlético de Kolkata defeated Mumbai City 3–0 at the Salt Lake Stadium. The season ended on 20 December when Atlético de Kolkata defeated the Kerala Blasters in the final 1–0. Mohammed Rafique was the lone goalscorer as the Kolkata club became the inaugural champions.

Teams

Stadiums and locations

Personnel and sponsorship

Marquee players

Player drafts
Before the season began, the rosters were formed through two player drafts, based on the college draft system used in the United States. The first draft would be to sign the initial 14 Indian players and then the second one would be to sign seven foreign players.

Domestic players draft

The domestic players draft took place within two days on 22 July and 23 July 2014 in Mumbai. There were 84 players up for grabs during the draft that could be selected between six of the eight Indian Super League teams (Goa and NorthEast United selected from their respective I-League teams). Close to 50% of the 84 players had played for India internationally. The opening pick in the draft was Lenny Rodrigues by FC Pune City. Subrata Pal, Syed Nabi, and Gouramangi Singh were the most expensive picks during the draft.

International draft

After the completion of the domestic draft, the international draft took place on 21 August 2014, also in Mumbai. There were 49 players available for selection during the draft. The first pick in the draft was former Inter Milan defender, Bruno Cirillo, who was selected by FC Pune City.

Regular season

League table

Results

Playoffs

Semi-finals

First leg

Second leg

Final

Attendance

Average home attendances
Note: Table lists in order of average attendance.

Highest attendances

Source:

Statistics

Scoring

Top scorers

Top Indian scorers

Hat-tricks

Assists

Clean sheets

Awards

Hero of the Match

End-of-season awards

See also

 2014 Atlético de Kolkata season
 2014 Chennaiyin FC season
 2014 Delhi Dynamos FC season
 2014 FC Goa season
 2014 Kerala Blasters FC season
 2014 Mumbai City FC season
 2014 NorthEast United FC season
 2014 FC Pune City season

References

External links
 

 
Indian Super League seasons
1
India